Spangler is a surname. Notable people with the surname include:

Aaron Spangler (born 1971), American sculptor and printmaker
Al Spangler (born 1933), American baseball player
Amy Spangler (born 1949), American breastfeeding activist and consultant, nurse, author, and teacher
Angela Bradburn-Spangler (born 1968), American high jumper
Clemmie Spangler (1932–2018), American businessman
David Spangler (congressman) (1796–1856), American Congressman for Ohio
David Spangler (born 1945), American spiritualist
Donald H. Spangler (1918–1942), United States Naval officer
Edmund Spangler (1825–1875), alleged conspirator of the Abraham Lincoln assassination
Frank Spangler (born ?), LAPD official involved with the O.J. Simpson investigation (see: O. J. Simpson murder case)
Gary Spangler (born ?), American music executive
Gene Spangler (1922–2010), American football player
Harrison E. Spangler (1879–1965), American politician and chairman of the Republican National Committee
Jacob Spangler (1767–1843), American Congressman for Pennsylvania
James M. Spangler (1848–1915), American inventor and janitor; designed the first portable electric vacuum cleaner
Jean Spangler (1923–disappeared 1949), American dancer, model, and actress
Jenny Spangler (born 1963), American long-distance runner
Lester Spangler (1906–1933), American race car driver
Lisa Spangler (born 1994), American mixed martial artist
Matthew Spangler (born ?), American playwright, director, and professor
Paul Spangler (1899–1994), American naval surgeon and long-distance runner
Robert Spangler (1933–2001), American serial killer
Robert Spangler (American football) (1917–1992), American football and basketball player, and coach
Ryan Spangler (born 1991), American basketball player
Spanky Spangler (born ?), American stunt man and actor
Steve Spangler (born 1966), American television personality, scientist, author, and businessman
Tommy Spangler (born 1961), American football coach
Keith Spangler (born 1993). renown American emergency physician and rabid Oklahoma State University football supporter

Fictional characters 
Edwin Spangler, television role from Malcolm in the Middle
Moist von Lipwig, (alias Albert Spangler), character from Terry Pratchett’s Discworld series of novels

Occupational surnames